Oscar-Claude Monet (14 November 1840 – 5 December 1926) was a French painter and founder of impressionist painting who is seen as a key precursor to modernism, especially in his attempts to paint nature as he perceived it. During his long career, he was the most consistent and prolific practitioner of impressionism's philosophy of expressing one's perceptions before nature, especially as applied to plein air (outdoor) landscape painting. The term "Impressionism" is derived from the title of his painting Impression, soleil levant, exhibited in 1874 (the "exhibition of rejects") initiated by Monet and his associates as an alternative to the Salon.

Monet was raised in Le Havre, Normandy, and became interested in the outdoors and drawing from an early age. Although his mother, Louise-Justine Aubrée Monet, supported his ambitions to be a painter, his father, Claude-Adolphe, disapproved and wanted him to pursue a career in business. He was very close to his mother, but she died in January 1857 when he was sixteen years old, and he was sent to live with his childless, widowed but wealthy aunt, Marie-Jeanne Lecadre. He went on to study at the Académie Suisse, and under the academic history painter Charles Gleyre, where he was a classmate of Auguste Renoir. His early works include landscapes, seascapes, and portraits, but attracted little attention. A key early influence was Eugène Boudin who introduced him to the concept of plein air painting. From 1883, Monet lived in Giverny, also in northern France, where he purchased a house and property and began a vast landscaping project, including a water-lily pond.

Monet's ambition to document the French countryside led to a method of painting the same scene many times so as to capture the changing of light and the passing of the seasons. Among the best-known examples are his series of haystacks (1890–91), paintings of the Rouen Cathedral (1894), and the paintings of water lilies in his garden in Giverny that occupied him continuously for the last 20 years of his life.

Frequently exhibited and successful during his lifetime, Monet's fame and popularity soared in the second half of the 20th century when he became one of the world's most famous painters and a source of inspiration for burgeoning groups of artists.

Biography

Birth and childhood
Claude Monet was born on 14 November 1840 on the fifth floor of 45 rue Laffitte, in the 9th arrondissement of Paris. He was the second son of Claude Adolphe Monet and Louise Justine Aubrée Monet, both of them second-generation Parisians. On 20 May 1841, he was baptised in the local paris church, Notre-Dame-de-Lorette, as Oscar-Claude, but his parents called him simply Oscar. Despite being baptised Catholic, Monet later became an atheist.

In 1845, his family moved to Le Havre in Normandy. His father, a wholesale merchant, wanted him to go into the family's ship-chandling and grocery business, but Monet wanted to become an artist. His mother was a singer, and supported Monet's desire for a career in art.

On 1 April 1851, he entered Le Havre secondary school of the arts. He was an apathetic student who, after showing skill in art from young age, began drawing caricatures and portraits of acquaintances at age 15 for money. He began his first drawing lessons from Jacques-François Ochard, a former student of Jacques-Louis David. In around 1858, he met fellow artist Eugène Boudin, who would encourage Monet to develop his techniques, teach him the "en plein air" (outdoor) techniques for painting and take Monet on painting excursions. Monet thought of Boudin as his master, whom "he owed everything to" for his later success.

In 1857, his mother died. He lived with his father and aunt, Marie-Jeanne Lecadre; Lecadre would be a source of support for Monet in his early art career.

Paris and Algeria 
From 1858 to 1860, Monet continued his studies in Paris, where he enrolled in Académie Suisse and met Camille Pissarro in 1859. He was called for military service and served under the Chasseurs d'Afrique (African Hunters), in Algeria, from 1861 to 1862. His time in Algeria had a powerful effect on Monet, who later said that the light and vivid colours of North Africa "contained the gem of my future researches". Illness forced his return to Le Havre, where he bought out his remaining service and met Johan Barthold Jongkind, who together with Boudin was an important mentor to Monet.

Upon his return to Paris, with the permission of his father, he divided his time between his childhood home and the countryside and enrolled in Charles Gleyre's studio, where he met Pierre-Auguste Renoir and Frédéric Bazille. Bazille eventually became his closest friend. In search of motifs, they traveled to Honfleur where Monet painted several "studies" of the harbor and the mouth of the Seine. Monet often painted alongside Renoir and Alfred Sisley, both of whom shared his desire to articulate new standards of beauty in conventional subjects.

During this time he painted Women in Garden, his first successful large-scale painting, and Le déjeuner sur l'herbe, the "most important painting of Monet's early period". Having debuted at the Salon in 1865 with La Pointe de la Hève at Low Tide and Mouth of the Seine at Honfleur to large praise, he hoped Le déjeuner sur l'herbe would help him break through into the Salon of 1866. He could not finish it in a timely manner and instead submitted The Woman in the Green Dress and Pavé de Chailly to acceptance. Thereafter, he submitted works to the Salon annually until 1870, but they were accepted by the juries only twice, in 1866 and 1868. He sent no more works to the Salon until his single, final attempt in 1880. His work was considered radical, "discouraged at all official levels".

In 1867 his then-mistress, Camille Doncieux—whom he had met two years earlier as a model for his paintings—gave birth to their first child, Jean. Monet had a strong relationship with Jean, claiming that Camille was his lawful wife so Jean would be considered legitimate. Monet's father stopped financially supporting him as a result of the relationship. Earlier in the year Monet had been forced to move to his aunt's house in Sainte-Adresse. There he immersed himself in his work, although a temporary problem with his eyesight, probably related to stress, prevented him from working in sunlight. Monet loved his family dearly, painting many portraits of them such as child with a cup, a portrait of Jean Monet. This painting in particular shows the first signs of Monets’ later famous impressionistic work. 

With help from the art collector Louis-Joachim Gaudibert, he reunited with Camille and moved to Étretat the following year. Around this time, he was trying to establish himself as a figure painter who depicted the "explicitly contemporary, bourgeois", an intention that continued into the 1870s. He did evolve his painting technique and integrate stylistic experimentation in his plein-air style—as evidenced by The Beach at Sainte-Adresse and On the Bank of the Seine respectively, the former being his "first sustained campaign of painting that involved tourism".

Several of his paintings had been purchased by Gaudibert, who commissioned a painting of his wife, alongside other projects; the Gaudiberts were for two years "the most supportive of Monet's hometown patrons". Monet would later be financially supported by the artist and art collector Gustave Caillebotte, Bazille and perhaps Gustave Courbet, although creditors still pursued him.

Exile and Argenteuil 

He married Camille on 28 June 1870, just before the outbreak of the Franco-Prussian War. During the war, he and his family lived in London and the Netherlands to avoid conscription. Monet and Charles-François Daubigny lived in self-imposed exile. While living in London, Monet met his old friend Pissarro, the American painter James Abbott McNeill Whistler, and befriended his first and primary art dealer Paul Durand-Ruel; an encounter that would be decisive for his career. There he saw and admired the works of John Constable and J. M. W. Turner and was impressed by Turner's treatment of light, especially in the works depicting the fog on the Thames. He repeatedly painted the Thames, Hyde Park and Green Park. In the spring of 1871, his works were refused authorisation for inclusion in the Royal Academy exhibition and police suspected him of revolutionary activities. That same year he learned of his father's death.

The family moved to Argenteuil in 1871, where he, influenced by his time with Dutch painters, mostly painted the Seine's surrounding area. He acquired a sailboat to paint on the river. In 1874, he signed a six-and-a-half year lease and moved into a newly built "rose-colored house with green shutters" in Argenteuil, where he painted fifteen paintings of his garden from a panoramic perspective. Paintings such as Gladioli marked what was likely the first time Monet had cultivated a garden for the purpose of his art. The house and garden became the "single most important" motif of his final years in Argenteuil. For the next four years, he painted mostly in Argenteuil and took an interest in the colour theories of chemist Michel Eugène Chevreul. For three years of the decade, he rented a large villa in Saint-Denis for a thousand francs per year. Camille Monet on a Garden Bench displays the garden of the villa, and what some have argued to be Camille's grief upon learning of her father's death.

Monet and Camille were often in financial straits during this period—they were unable to pay their hotel bill during the summer of 1870 and likely lived on the outskirts of London as a result of insufficient funds. An inheritance from his father, together with sales of his paintings, did, however, enable them to hire two servants and a gardener by 1872. Following the successful exhibition of some maritime paintings and the winning of a silver medal at Le Havre, Monet's paintings were seized by creditors, from whom they were bought back by a shipping merchant, Gaudibert, who was also a patron of Boudin.

Impressionism

When Durand-Ruel's previous support of Monet and his peers began to decline, Monet, Renoir, Pissarro, Sisley, Paul Cézanne, Edgar Degas, and Berthe Morisot exhibited their work independently; they did so under the name the Anonymous Society of Painters, Sculptors and Engravers for which Monet was a leading figure in its formation. He was inspired by the style and subject matter of his slightly older contemporaries, Pissarro and Édouard Manet. The group, whose title was chosen to avoid association with any style or movement, were unified in their independence from the Salon and rejection of the prevailing academicism. Monet gained a reputation as the foremost landscape painter of the group.

At the first exhibition, in 1874, Monet displayed, among others, Impression, Sunrise, The Luncheon and Boulevard des Capucines. The art critic Louis Leroy wrote a hostile review. Taking particular notice of Impression, Sunrise (1872), a hazy depiction of Le Havre port and stylistic detour, he coined the term "Impressionism". Conservative critics and the public derided the group, with the term initially being ironic and denoting the painting as unfinished. More progressive critics praised the depiction of modern life—Louis Edmond Duranty called their style a "revolution in painting". He later regretted inspiring the name, as he believed that they were a group "whose majority had nothing impressionist".

The total attendance is estimated at 3500. Monet priced Impression: Sunrise at 1000 francs but failed to sell it. The exhibition was open to anyone prepared to pay 60 francs and gave artists the opportunity to show their work without the interference of a jury. Another exhibition was held in 1876, again in opposition to the Salon. Monet displayed 18 paintings, including The Beach at Sainte-Adresse which showcased multiple Impressionist characteristics.

For the third exhibition, on 5 April 1877, he selected seven paintings from the dozen he had made of Gare Saint-Lazare in the past three months, the first time he had "synced as many paintings of the same site, carefully coordinating their scenes and temporalities". The paintings were well received by critics, who especially praised the way he captured the arrival and departures of the trains. By the fourth exhibition his involvement was by means of negotiation on Caillebotte's part. His last time exhibiting with the Impressionists was in 1882—four years before the final Impressionist exhibition.

Monet, Renoir, Pissarro, Morisot, Cézanne and Sisley proceeded to experiment with new methods of depicting reality. They rejected the dark, contrasting lighting of romantic and realist paintings, in favour of the pale tones of their peers' paintings such as those by Jean-Baptiste-Camille Corot and Boudin. After developing methods for painting transient effects, Monet would go on to seek more demanding subjects, new patrons and collectors; his paintings produced in the early 1870s left a lasting impact on the movement and his peers—many of whom moved to Argenteuil as a result of admiring his depiction.

Death of Camille and Vétheuil 

In 1875, he returned to figure painting with Woman with a Parasol - Madame Monet and Her Son, after effectively abandoning it with The Luncheon. His interest in the figure continued for the next four years—reaching its crest in 1877 and concluding altogether in 1890. In an "unusually revealing" letter to Théodore Duret, Monet discussed his revitalised interest: "I am working like never before on a new endeavour figures in plein air, as I understand them. This is an old dream, one that has always obsessed me and that I would like to master once and for all. But it is all so difficult! I am working very hard, almost to the point of making myself ill".

In 1876, Camille Monet became seriously ill. Their second son, Michel, was born in 1878, after which Camille's health deteriorated further. In the autumn of that year, they moved to the village of Vétheuil where they shared a house with the family of Ernest Hoschedé, a wealthy department store owner and patron of the arts who had commissioned four paintings from Monet. In 1878, Camille was diagnosed with uterine cancer. She died the next year. Her death, alongside financial difficulties—once having to leave his house to avoid creditors—afflicted Monet's career; Hoschedé had recently purchased several paintings but soon went bankrupt, leaving for Paris in hopes of regaining his fortune, as interest in the Impressionists dwindled.

 
Monet made a study in oils of his late wife. Many years later, he confessed to his friend Georges Clemenceau that his need to analyse colours was both a joy and a torment to him. He explained: "I one day found myself looking at my beloved wife's dead face and just systematically noting the colours according to an automatic reflex". John Berger describes the work as "a blizzard of white, grey, purplish paint ... a terrible blizzard of loss which will forever efface her features. In fact there can be very few death-bed paintings which have been so intensely felt or subjectively expressive."

Monet's study of the Seine continued. He submitted two paintings to the Salon in 1880, one of which was accepted. He began to abandon Impressionist techniques as his paintings utilised darker tones and displayed environments, such as the Seine river, in harsh weather. For the rest of the decade, he focused on the elemental aspect of nature. His personal life influenced his distancing from the Impressionists. He returned to Étretat and expressed in letters to Alice Hoschedé—who he would marry in 1892, following her husband's death the preceding year—a desire to die. In 1881, he moved with Alice and her children to Poissy and again sold his paintings to Durand-Ruel. Alice's third daughter, Suzanne, would become Monet's "preferred model", after Camille.

In April 1883, looking out the window of the train between Vernon and Gasny, he discovered Giverny in Normandy. That same year his first major retrospective show was held.

Monet's struggles with creditors ended following prosperous trips; he went to Bordighera in 1884, and brought back 50 landscapes. He travelled to the Netherlands in 1886 to paint the tulips. He soon met and became friends with Gustave Geffroy, who published an article on Monet. Despite his qualms, Monet's paintings were sold in America and contributed towards his financial security. In contrast to the last two decades of his career, Monet favoured working alone—and felt that he was always better when he did, having regularly "long[ed] for solitude, away from crowded tourist resorts and sophisticated urban settings". Such a desire was recurrent in his letters to Alice.

Giverny

In 1883, Monet and his family rented a house and gardens in Giverny, which provided him domestic stability he had not yet enjoyed. The house was situated near the main road between the towns of Vernon and Gasny at Giverny. There was a barn that doubled as a painting studio, orchards and a small garden. The house was close enough to the local schools for the children to attend, and the surrounding landscape provided numerous natural areas for Monet to paint.

The family worked and built up the gardens, and Monet's fortunes began to change for the better as Durand-Ruel had increasing success in selling his paintings. The gardens were Monet's greatest source of inspiration for 40 years. In 1890, Monet purchased the house. During the 1890s, Monet built a greenhouse and a second studio, a spacious building well lit with skylights.

Monet wrote daily instructions to his gardener, precise designs and layouts for plantings, and invoices for his floral purchases and his collection of botany books. As Monet's wealth grew, his garden evolved. He remained its architect, even after he hired seven gardeners. Monet purchased additional land with a water meadow. White water lilies local to France were planted along with imported cultivars from South America and Egypt, resulting in a range of colours including yellow, blue and white lilies that turned pink with age. In 1902, he increased the size of his water garden by nearly 4000 square metres; the pond was enlarged in 1901 and 1910 with easels installed all around to allow different perspectives to be captured.

Dissatisfied with the limitations of Impressionism, Monet began to work on series of paintings displaying single subjects—haystacks, poplars and the Rouen Cathedral—to resolve his frustration. These series of paintings provided widespread critical and financial success; in 1898, 61 paintings were exhibited at the Petit gallery. He also begun a series of Mornings on the Seine, which portrayed the dawn hours of the river. In 1887 and 1889 he displayed a series of paintings of Belle Île to rave reviews by critics. Monet chose the location in the hope of finding a "new aesthetic language that bypassed learned formulas, one that would be both true to nature and unique to him as an individual, not like anyone else."

In 1899, he began painting the water lilies that would occupy him continuously for the next 20 years of his life, being his last and "most ambitious" sequence of paintings. He had exhibited this first group of pictures of the garden, devoted primarily to his Japanese bridge, in 1900. He returned to London—now residing at the prestigious Savoy Hotel—in 1899 to produce a series that included 41 paintings of Waterloo bridge, 34 of Charing Cross bridge and 19 of the House of Parliament. Monet's final journey would be to Venice, with Alice in 1908.

Depictions of the water lilies, with alternating light and mirror-like reflections, became an integral part of his work. By the mid-1910s Monet had achieved "a completely new, fluid, and somewhat audacious style of painting in which the water-lily pond became the point of departure for an almost abstract art". Claude Roger-Marx noted in a review of Monet's successful 1909 exhibition of the first Water Lilies series that he had "reached the ultimate degree of abstraction and imagination joined to the real". This  exhibition, entitled Waterlilies, a Series of Waterscape, consisted of 42 canvases, his "largest and most unified series to date". He would ultimately make over 250 paintings of the Waterlilies.

At his house, Monet met with artists, writers, intellectuals and politicians from France, England, Japan and the United States. In the summer of 1887 he met John Singer Sargent whose experimentation with figure painting out of doors intrigued him; the pair went on to frequently influence each other.

Failing sight

Monet's second wife, Alice, died in 1911, and his oldest son, Jean, who had married Alice's daughter, Blanche, Monet's particular favourite, died in 1914. Their deaths left Monet depressed, as Blanche cared for him. It was during this time that Monet began to develop the first signs of cataracts. In 1913, Monet travelled to London to consult the German ophthalmologist Richard Liebreich. He was prescribed new glasses and rejected cataract surgery for the right eye. The next year, Monet, encouraged by Clemenceau, made plans to construct a new, large studio that he could use to create a "decorative cycle of paintings devoted to the water garden".

In the following years, his perception of colour suffered; his broad strokes were broader and his paintings were increasingly darker. To achieve his desired outcome, he began to label his tubes of paint, kept a strict order on his palette and wore a straw hat to negate glare.  He approached painting by formulating the ideas and features in his mind, taking the "motif in large masses" and transcribing them through memory and imagination. This was due to him being "insensitive" to the "finer shades of tonalities and colors seen close up".

Monet's output decreased as he became withdrawn, although he did produce several panel paintings for the French Government, from 1914 to 1918 to great financial success and he would later create works for the state. His work on the "cycle of paintings" mostly occurred around 1916 to 1921. Cataract surgery was once again recommended, this time by Clemenceau. Monet—who was apprehensive, following Honoré Daumier and Mary Cassatt's botched surgeries—stated that he would rather have poor sight and perhaps abandon painting than forego "a little of these things that I love". In 1919, Monet began a series of landscape paintings, "in full force" although he was not pleased with the outcome. By October the weather caused Monet to cease plein air painting and the next month he sold four of the eleven Water Lilies paintings, despite his then-reluctance to relinquish his work. The series inspired praise from his peers; his later works were well received by dealers and collectors, and he received 200,000 francs from one collector.

In 1922 a prescription of mydriatics provided short-lived relief. He eventually underwent cataract surgery in 1923. Persistent cyanopsia and aphakic spectacles proved to be a struggle. Now "able to see the real colours", he began to destroy canvases from his pre-operative period. Upon receiving tinted Zeiss lenses, Monet was laudatory, although his left eye soon had to be entirely covered by a black lens. By 1925, his visual impairment was improved and he began to retouch some of his pre-operative works, with bluer water lilies than before.

During World War I, in which his younger son, Michel, served, Monet painted a Weeping Willow series as homage to the French fallen soldiers. He became deeply dedicated to the decorations of his garden during the war.

Method

Monet has been described as "the driving force behind Impressionism". Crucial to the art of the Impressionist painters was the understanding of the effects of light on the local colour of objects, and the effects of the juxtaposition of colours with each other. His free flowing style and use of colour have been described as "almost etheral" and the "[epitome] of impressionist style"; Impression, Sunrise is an example of the "fundamental" Impressionist principle of depicting only that which is purely visible. Monet was fascinated with the effects of light, and painting en plein air—he believed that his only "merit lies in having painted directly in front of nature, seeking to render my impressions of the most fleeting effects" Wanting to "paint the air", he often combined modern life subjects in outdoor light.

Monet made light the central focus of his paintings. To capture its variations, he would sometimes complete a painting in one sitting, often without preparation. He wished to demonstrate how light altered colour and perception of reality. His interest in light and reflection began in the late 1860s and lasted throughout his career. During his first time in London, he developed an admiration for the relationship between the artist and motifs—for what he deemed the "envelope". He utilised pencil drawings to quickly note subjects and motifs for future reference.

Monet's portrayal of landscapes emphasised industrial elements such as railways and factories; his early seascapes featured brooding nature depicted with muted colours and local residents. Critic, and friend of Monet, Théodore Duret noted, in 1874, that he was "little attracted by rustic scenes...He [felt] particularly drawn towards nature when it is embellished and towards urban scenes and for preference he paint[ed] flowery gardens, parks and groves." When depicting figures and landscapes in tandem, Monet wished for the landscape to not be a mere backdrop and the figures not to be dominate the composition. His dedication to such a portrayal of landscapes resulted in Monet reprimanding Renoir for defying it. He often depicted the suburban and rural leisure activities of Paris and as a young artist experimented with still lifes. From the 1870s onwards, he gradually moved away from suburban and urban landscapes—when they were depicted it was to further his study of light. Contemporary critics—and later academics—felt that with his choice of showcasing Belle Île, he had indicated a desire to move away from the modern culture of Impressionist paintings and instead towards primitive nature.

After meeting Boudin, Monet dedicated himself to searching for new and improved methods of painterly expression. To this end, as a young man, he visited the Salon and familiarised himself with the works of older painters, and made friends with other young artists. The five years that he spent at Argenteuil, spending much time on the River Seine in a little floating studio, were formative in his study of the effects of light and reflections. He began to think in terms of colours and shapes rather than scenes and objects. He used bright colours in dabs and dashes and squiggles of paint. Having rejected the academic teachings of Gleyre's studio, he freed himself from theory, saying "I like to paint as a bird sings." Boudin, Daubigny, Jongkind, Courbet, and Corot were among Monet's influences and he would often work in accordance with developments in avant-garde art.

In 1877 a series of paintings at St-Lazare Station had Monet looking at smoke and steam and the way that they affected colour and visibility, being sometimes opaque and sometimes translucent. He was to further use this study in the painting of the effects of mist and rain on the landscape. The study of the effects of atmosphere was to evolve into a number of series of paintings in which Monet repeatedly painted the same subject (such as his water lilies series) in different lights, at different hours of the day, and through the changes of weather and season. This process began in the 1880s and continued until the end of his life in 1926. In his later career, Monet "transcended" the Impressionist style and begun to push the boundaries of art.

Monet refined his palette in the 1870s, consciously minimising the use of darker tones and favouring pastel colours. This coincided with his softer approach, using smaller and more varied brush strokes. His palette would again undergo change in the 1880s, with more emphasise than before on harmony between warm and cold hues. Following his optical operation in 1923, Monet returned to his style from before a decade ago. He forwent garish colours or "coarse application" for emphasised colour schemes of blue and green. Whilst suffering from cataracts, his paintings were more broad and abstract—from the late 1880s onwards, he had simplified his compositions and sought subjects which could offer broad colour and tone. He increasingly used red and yellow tones, a trend that first started following his trip to Venice. Monet often travelled alone at this time—from France to Normanday to London; to the Rivera and Rouen—in search of new and more challenging subjects.

The stylistic change was likely a by-product of the disorder and not an intentional choice. Monet would often work on large canvases due to the deterioration of his eyesight and by 1920 he admitted that he had grown too accustomed to broad painting to return to small canvases. The influence of his cataracts on his output has been a topic of discussion among academics; Lane et al. (1997) argues the occurrence of a deterioration from the late 1860s onwards led to a diminishing of sharp lines. Gardens were a focus throughout his art, becoming prominent in his later work, especially during the last decade of his life. Daniel Wildenstein noted a "seamless" continuity in his paintings that was "enriched by innovation".

From the 1880s onwards—and particularly in the 1890s—Monet's series of paintings of specific subjects sought to document the different conditions of light and weather. As light and weather changed throughout the day, he switched between canvases—sometimes working on as many as eight at one time—usually spending an hour on each. In 1895, he exhibited 20 paintings of Rouen Cathedral, showcasing the façade in different conditions of light, weather and atmosphere. The paintings do not focus on the grand Medieval building, but on the play of light and shade across its surface, transforming the solid masonry. For this series, he experimented with creating his own frames.

His first series exhibited was of haystacks, painted from different points of view and at different times of the day. Fifteen of the paintings were exhibited at the Galerie Durand-Ruel in 1891. In 1892 he produced twenty-six views of Rouen Cathedral. Between 1883 and 1908, Monet travelled to the Mediterranean, where he painted landmarks, landscapes, and seascapes, including a series of paintings in Venice. In London he painted four series: the Houses of Parliament, London, Charing Cross Bridge, Waterloo Bridge, and Views of Westminster Bridge. Helen Gardner writes:

Water lilies

Following his return from London, Monet painted mostly from nature, in his own garden; its water lilies, its pond and its bridge. From 22 November to 15 December 1900, another exhibition dedicated to him was held at the Durand-Ruel gallery, with around ten versions of the Water Lilies exhibited. This same exhibition was organized in February 1901 in New York City, where it was met with great success.

In 1901, Monet enlarged the pond of his home by buying a meadow located on the other side of the Ru, the local watercourse. He then divided his time between work on nature and work in his studio.

The canvases dedicated to the water lilies evolved with the changes made to his garden. In addition, around 1905, Monet gradually modified his aesthetics by abandoning the perimeter of the body of water and therefore modifying perspective. He also changed the shape and size of his canvases by moving from rectangular stretchers to square and then circular stretchers.

These canvases were created with great difficulty: Monet spent a significant amount of time reworking them in order to find the perfect effects and impressions. When he deemed them unsuccessful he did not hesitate to destroy them. He continually postponed the Durand-Ruel exhibition until he was satisfied with the works. After several postponements dating back to 1906, the exhibition titled Les Nymphéas ended up opening on 6 May 1909. Comprising forty-eight paintings dating from 1903 to 1908, representing a series of landscapes and water lily scenes, this exhibition was once again a success.

Death

Monet died of lung cancer on 5 December 1926 at the age of 86 and is buried in the Giverny church cemetery. Monet had insisted that the occasion be simple; thus, only about fifty people attended the ceremony. At his funeral, Clemenceau removed the black cloth draped over the coffin, stating: "No black for Monet!" and replaced it with a flower-patterned cloth. At the time of his death, Waterlilies was "technically unfinished".

Monet's home, garden, and water lily pond were bequeathed by Michel to the French Academy of Fine Arts (part of the Institut de France) in 1966. Through the Fondation Claude Monet, the house and gardens were opened for visits in 1980, following restoration. In addition to souvenirs of Monet and other objects of his life, the house contains his collection of Japanese woodcut prints. The house and garden, along with the Museum of Impressionism, are major attractions in Giverny, which hosts tourists from all over the world.

Legacy
Speaking of Monet's body of work, Wildenstein said that it is "so extensive that its very ambition and diversity challenges our understanding of its importance". His paintings produced at Giverny and under the influence of cataracts have been said to create a link between Impressionism and twentieth-century art and modern abstract art, respectively. His later works were a "major" inspiration to Objective abstraction. Ellsworth Kelly, following a formative experience at Giverny, paid homage to Monet's works created there with Tableau Vert (1952). Monet has been called an "intermediary" between tradition and modernism—his work has been examined in relation to postmodernism—and was an influence to Bazille, Sisley, Renoir and Pissarro. Monet is now the most famous of the Impressionists; as a result of his contributions to the movement, he "exerted a huge influence on late 19th-century art".

In May 1927, 27 panel paintings were displayed in the Musée de l'Orangerie, following lengthy negotiations with the French government. Due to his later works being ignored by artists, art historians, critics and the public few attended the showing. In the 1950s, Monet's later works were "rediscovered" by the Abstract Expressionists, and those adjacent like Clement Greenberg, who used a similar canvases and held a disinterest in the blunt and ideological art of the war. A 1952 essay by André Masson helped change the perception of the paintings and inspire appreciation that begin to take shape in 1956–1957. The next year, a fire in the Museum of Modern Art would see the Water Lilies paintings acquired by them burn. The large scale nature of Monet's later paintings proved to be difficult for some museums, which resulted in them altering the framing.

In 1978, Monet's garden in Giverny—which had  grown decrepit over fifty years—was restored and opened to the public. In 2004, London, the Parliament, Effects of Sun in the Fog (Londres, le Parlement, trouée de soleil dans le brouillard; 1904), sold for US$20.1 million. In 2006, the journal Proceedings of the Royal Society published a paper providing evidence that these were painted in situ at St Thomas' Hospital over the river Thames. In 1981, Ronald Pickvance noted that Monet's works after 1880 were increasingly receiving scholarly attention.

Falaises près de Dieppe (Cliffs Near Dieppe) has been stolen on two occasions: once in 1998 (in which the museum's curator was convicted of the theft and jailed for five years and two months along with two accomplices) and most recently in August 2007. It was recovered in June 2008.

On November 14th, 2001, a Google Doodle was made for Claude Monet's 161st birthday, depicting the Google logo 
in Monet's signature style. It was the first Google Doodle made for someone’s birthday.

Monet's Le Pont du chemin de fer à Argenteuil, an 1873 painting of a railway bridge spanning the Seine near Paris, was bought by an anonymous telephone bidder for a record $41.4 million at Christie's auction in New York on 6 May 2008. The previous record for his painting stood at $36.5 million. A few weeks later, Le bassin aux nymphéas (from the water lilies series) sold at Christie's 24 June 2008 auction in London for £40,921,250 ($80,451,178), nearly doubling the record for the artist. This purchase represented one of the top 20 highest prices paid for a painting at the time.

In October 2013, Monet's paintings, L'Eglise de Vétheuil and Le Bassin aux Nympheas, became subjects of a legal case in New York against NY-based Vilma Bautista, one-time aide to Imelda Marcos, wife of dictator Ferdinand Marcos, after she sold Le Bassin aux Nympheas for $32 million to a Swiss buyer. The said Monet paintings, along with two others, were acquired by Imelda during her husband's presidency and allegedly bought using the nation's funds. Bautista's lawyer claimed that the aide sold the painting for Imelda but did not have a chance to give her the money. The Philippine government seeks the return of the painting. Le Bassin aux Nympheas, also known as Japanese Footbridge over the Water-Lily Pond at Giverny, is part of Monet's famed Water Lilies series.

Nazi looting 
Under the Nazi regime, both in Germany from 1933 and in German-occupied countries until 1945, Jewish art collectors of Monet were looted by Nazis and their agents. Several of the stolen artworks have been restituted to their former owners, while others have been the object of court battles. In 2014, during the spectacular discovery of a hidden trove of art in Munich, a Monet that had belonged to a Jewish retail magnate was found in the suitcase of Cornelius Gurlitt, the son of one of Hitler's official art dealers of looted art, Hildebrand Gurlitt.

Examples of Nazi-looted Monet works include:
 La Seine à Asnières/Les Péniches sur la Seine, formerly owned by Mrs. Fernand Halphen, taken by agents of the German Embassy in Paris on 10 July 1940.
 Le Repos Dans Le Jardin Argenteuil, previously owned by Henry and Maria Newman, stolen from a Berlin bank vault, settlement with the Metropolitan Museum of Art.
 Nymphéas, stolen by Nazis in 1940 from Paul Rosenberg.
 Au Parc Monceau, previously owned by Ludwig Kainer, whose vast collection was looted by the Nazis.
Haystacks at Giverny belonged to René Gimpel, a French Jewish art dealer killed in a Nazi concentration camp.

See also 
 List of paintings by Claude Monet

Footnotes

References

Sources

 

 Berger, John (1985). The White Bird. London: Chatto & Windus.

External links

 
 Claude Monet, Ministère de la culture et de la communication
 Claude Monet, Joconde, Portail des collections des musées de France
 Monet at Giverny
 Union List of Artist Names, Getty Vocabularies
 Claude Monet at The Guggenheim
 Monet at Norton Simon Museum
 Impressionism: a centenary exhibition, an exhibition catalog from The Metropolitan Museum of Art (fully available online as PDF), which contains material on Monet (p. 131–167)
 Monet: The Late Years exhibition at Kimbell Art Museum

 
1840 births
1926 deaths
19th-century French painters
20th-century French painters
20th-century male artists
École des Beaux-Arts alumni
Artists from Paris
Burials in Normandy
Deaths from lung cancer in France
French atheists
French Impressionist painters
French male painters
Légion d'honneur refusals
Artists from Le Havre
People from Eure